The Miss Perú 2012/13 pageant was held on June 30, 2012 at the Real Felipe Fortress Convention Center in Callao, Perú.

Due to the restructuring of the contest, Nicole Faverón of Loreto, 1st-Runner Up at Miss Peru 2011 was appointed to participate at Miss Universe 2012, and Giuliana Zevallos, also from Loreto and former Miss Peru 2010 was appointed to participate at Miss World 2012.

The outgoing titleholder, Natalie Vertiz of USA Peru crowned her successor, Cindy Mejia of Region Lima at the end of the event.

The candidates competed for 2 national crowns and the right to compete in 2013 editions of Miss Universe, Miss World, and other selected pageants.

Placements

Miss

Special awards

 Best Regional Costume - Ayacucho - Diana Ascoy
 Miss Photogenic - La Libertad- Paola Rodríguez Larraín
 Miss Elegance - Cajamarca - Alexa Cáceres Drago
 Miss Body - Moquegua - Ana María Sologuren
 Best Hair - Ica - Rosángela Espinoza
 Miss Congeniality - Tumbes - Sharinna Vargas
 Most Beautiful Face - La Libertad- Paola Rodríguez Larraín
 Best Smile - Ucayali - Diana Rengifo
 Miss Internet - Junín - Kelin Rivera Kroll
 Miss Talent Show - Trujillo - Akemi Giura

.

Delegates

Amazonas - Jimena Alarcón
Apurímac - Claudia Martínez
Arequipa - Thais Flores
Ayacucho - Diana Ascoy
Cajamarca - Alexa Cáceres Drago
Callao - Melissa Paredes
Distrito Capital - Samantha Batallanos
Ica - Rosángela Espinoza
Junín - Kelin Rivera Kroll
La Libertad - Paola Rodríguez Larraín
Loreto - Fabiola Díaz

Madre de Dios - Daniela Miranda Escobar
Moquegua - Ana Sologuren Torres
Pasco - Pamela Verdi
Piura - Elba Fahsbender
Region Lima - Cindy Mejía
San Martín - Karen Caro López
Tacna - Claudia Soria
Trujillo - Akemi Giura
Tumbes - Sharinna Vargas
Ucayali - Diana Rengifo

References

External links
Official Site

Miss Peru
2013 in Peru
2013 beauty pageants